The West Palm Beach Open Invitational, first played as The West Palm Beach Open, was a PGA Tour event in the late 1950s and early 1960s. It was held at the West Palm Beach Country Club, now known as the West Palm Beach Golf Course, an 18-hole, par-72 championship course established in 1921 and in its present location in the southwestern corner of West Palm Beach, Florida since 1947.

The West Palm Beach Open was founded in 1954 as a 54-hole event with prize money of $2,000. Prize money increased to $5,000 in 1955 and $10,000 in 1956 and 1957. The 1957 event was run by the PGA. From 1958 to 1962 the tournament was a 72-hole PGA Tour event with prize money of $15,000 from 1958 to 1960 and $20,000 in 1961 and 1962. From 1963 the event returned to being a local event. The 1963 tournament was over 54 holes with a first prize of $500.

Winners

Notes

References

Former PGA Tour events
Golf in Florida
Sports in Palm Beach County, Florida
West Palm Beach, Florida